The National Liberty Museum is located at 321 Chestnut Street in Philadelphia, Pennsylvania, USA. It opened to the public in January 2000. The museum states that it is an independent learning and exhibit center supported by visitors, community leaders and foundations.

A 20-foot tall glass art sculpture entitled "Flame of Liberty" created by American sculptor Dale Chihuly is on display at the museum.

References

External links
 National Liberty Museum - official site

2000 establishments in Pennsylvania
Museums established in 2000
Museums in Philadelphia
History museums in Pennsylvania
Art museums and galleries in Pennsylvania